Thomas Nevin (1916–1972) was an Australian rugby league footballer who played in the 1930s and 1940s.

Playing career

Nevin was a Newtown five-eighth who played eleven seasons of first grade football with the club between 1935–1945. He won a premiership with Newtown, playing in the winning 1943 Grand Final. Remembered as a brilliant defender, Nevin played 135 first grade games with Newtown, the highlights being in the teams that won the 1937 City Cup, the 1941 State Cup, the 1943 premiership and the 1945 State Cup before retiring.

Nevin died suddenly from a heart attack on 6 May 1972, aged 56.

References

1916 births
1972 deaths
Newtown Jets players
Australian rugby league players
Rugby league five-eighths
Rugby league players from Sydney